"Always on Time" is a song by American rapper Ja Rule from his third studio album, Pain Is Love (2001). Produced by Irv Gotti, it was written by Rule, 7 Aurelius, and Irv Gotti and features guest vocals from Ashanti. Originally set to feature Brandy, the song was released as the album's second single on November 27, 2001, through Def Jam Recordings and Gotti's Murder Inc. Records.

"Always on Time" spent two weeks at the top of the Billboard Hot 100 in February and March 2002, becoming Ashanti's first Hot 100 number-one single and Ja Rule's second. It was followed by another Ja Rule duet, "Ain't It Funny (Murder Remix)" by Jennifer Lopez. In 2009, it was named the 33rd-most-successful song of the 2000s on the Billboard Hot R&B/Hip-Hop Songs chart and the 82nd-most-successful song of the 2000s on the Hot 100.

Track listings

UK CD1
 "Always on Time" (LP version)
 "Always on Time" (radio version)
 "I Cry" (LP version featuring Lil' Mo)
 "Always on Time" (full length video)

UK CD2 and European CD single
 "Always on Time" (radio edit)
 "Always on Time" (explicit album version)

UK cassette single
 "Always on Time" (radio version)
 "I Cry" (LP version featuring Lil' Mo)

UK 12-inch single
A1. "Always on Time" (LP version)
B1. "I Cry" (LP version featuring Lil' Mo)
B2. "Always on Time" (radio version)

Australasian CD single
 "Always on Time" (radio edit)
 "Always on Time" (explicit album version)
 "Always on Time" (instrumental)
 "Always on Time" (video)

Credits and personnel
Credits are taken from the Pain Is Love album booklet.

Studios
 Recorded at The Crackhouse (New York City)
 Mixed at The Hit Factory (New York City)
 Mastered at Bernie Grundman Mastering (Hollywood, California)

Personnel

 Ja Rule – writing (as Jeffrey Atkins)
 7 Aurelius – writing, all instruments, mixing
 Irv Gotti – writing (as Irving Lorenzo), production, mixing
 Ashanti – featured vocals, additional vocals
 Milwaukee Buck – recording
 Glen Marchese – mix engineering
 Brian Gardner – mastering

Charts

Weekly charts

Year-end charts

Decade-end charts

Certifications

Release history

See also
 List of Billboard Hot 100 number-one singles of 2002
 List of number-one R&B singles of 2002 (U.S.)

References

2001 singles
2001 songs
2002 singles
Ashanti (singer) songs
Billboard Hot 100 number-one singles
Def Jam Recordings singles
Ja Rule songs
Songs written by Channel 7 (musician)
Songs written by Irv Gotti
Songs written by Ja Rule